Ashutosh Varshney (born 1957) is an Indian-born political scientist and academic. He is currently the Sol Goldman Professor of International Studies and the Social Sciences and Professor of Political Science at Brown University, where he also directs the Saxena Center for Contemporary South Asia at the Watson Institute for International and Public Affairs. Varshney previously taught at Harvard University and the University of Michigan.

Early life and education 
Varshney was born in Uttar Pradesh in 1957. He received Bachelors and Master's degrees from the University of Allahabad. He spent a year at Jawaharlal Nehru University before matriculating at the Massachusetts Institute of Technology, where he earned a Sc.M. and Ph.D. in 1985 and 1990, respectively.

Work 
Varshney's books include Battles Half Won: India’s Improbable Democracy (2013), Collective Violence in Indonesia (2009), Ethnic Conflict and Civic Life: Hindus and Muslims in India (Yale 2002), India in the Era of Economic Reforms (1999), and Democracy, Development and the Countryside: Urban-Rural Struggles in India (Cambridge 1995).

He is currently working on three projects; a multi-country project on cities and ethnic conflict; political economy of urbanization in India; and Indian politics and society between elections.

He served on the former Secretary-General of the United Nations Kofi Annan’s Millennium Task Force on Poverty (2002-5). He has also served as an adviser to the World Bank, UNDP and the Club of Madrid.

Publications 
  Based on a special issue of the Journal of Development Studies guest edited. 
  Cambridge University Press, 1995; paperback edition, 1998. Winner of the Daniel Lerner Prize in its PhD dissertation form, MIT, 1990. Indian edition published by Foundation Books (Delhi) in 1996.
 
 
  Based in part on a special issue of Asian Survey. 
 
Reprinted as: 
  Based in part on a special issue of the Journal of East Asian Studies, guest edited.
 

Brown University faculty
1957 births
Harvard University faculty
Living people
Massachusetts Institute of Technology alumni
American political scientists
University of Michigan faculty
Writers about Hindu nationalism